X40 may refer to:

Boeing X-40, test platform for the X-37 Future-X Reusable Launch Vehicle
SJ X40, series of electric multiple units operated by SJ of Sweden
Southern Vectis route X40, bus route on the Isle of Wight, England
ThinkPad X40, laptop computer by Lenovo

de:X-40
fr:X40